Humber is an English brand of bicycle. Thomas Humber made himself a velocipede in 1868. From that time he built a substantial business in manufacturing tricycles and bicycles while continuously improving their design and construction. His products were so well-made and well-designed they were known as "the aristocrat among bicycles".

Though Thomas Humber retired from the cycle business in 1892 and went on to other things his brand name remained a high valued trademark for more than ninety years.


History

Thomas Humber (1841–1910) founded a bicycle manufacturing business at Nottingham which moved about 1878 to Beeston, Nottinghamshire. By 1887, still under his day-to-day management, it was owned by a public listed company, Humber & Co Limited. Thomas Humber improved cycle technology through the independence of his thinking and his practical ability. The reliability of his products arose from his high standards and emphasis on quality. It all led to Humber becoming regarded as the aristocrat among bicycles.
Velocipede
Thomas Humber,  at that time by trade a Nottingham blacksmith, had built himself a velocipede based on a picture in a letter about the Paris-developed machine that was published in the English Mechanic magazine in late 1868. He sold it and made an improved version—bought by the same buyer. It took him 2 months to make each velocipede, he was concerned to develop improvements: solid rubber tyres, ball-bearings, while maintaining quality and reliability. He instituted races to win public interest.

Ordinary or "Penny-farthing"

Thomas's own design of "ordinary", now commonly known as a "penny-farthing", appeared in 1871 and not long after James Starley's metal ordinary. His first price-list contained a testimonial by Fred Cooper, a racing cyclist. Another racing contact was Thomas Marriott.

Safety bicycle
Thomas Humber developed and patented the safety bicycle (1884) with a diamond-shaped frame and wheels of similar  size.

Ownership
Humber, Marriott and Cooper
Thomas Marriott joined Thomas Humber as a business partner in 1875 and Fred Cooper joined them two years later. They named their new firm Humber, Marriott & Cooper. Their staff of 80 or so needed more factory space so they built them a new works at Beeston.

Cooper and Marriott left the firm in 1885 but Thomas let them have equal rights to the name Humber. He also let them use the old partnership's patents. They set themselves up as cycle wholesalers and later got Rudge of Coventry to make the cycles for them. 
Humber and Lambert
Thomas Humber took in a new partner, Nottingham lace bleacher dyer and finisher, T Harrison Lambert, and they took charge of the whole Humber business and its Beeston works. Lambert was a cycle-racing friend building a reputation as a successful company promoter. 
Humber & Company Limited, public listed company
The cycle industry was consolidating and Humber and Lambert soon sold the business to speculators: William and Joseph Horton, Edward Alfred Hicks and Christopher Norris Baker, who added a number of other substantial cycle manufacturers and then floated the new combine on the stock exchange. Such was the public's recognition of Humber products and their high quality and reliability the whole new organisation was named Humber & Co Limited though Humber's was not the largest component.

Production, deliveries and order book just before combination

Thomas Humber agreed to manage the whole enterprise with its works in Coventry and Wolverhampton as well as Beeston. Aged 51, Thomas Humber retired in 1892 at the end of his 5-year contract.

Humber and Company (America) Limited, Humber and Company (France) Limited, Humber and Company (Extension) Limited etc.
A period of strong overseas expansion began in 1894 followed by an administrative separation of manufacturing from wholesaling and retailing. An 1896 joint venture with major French cycle companies, Clement and Gladiator failed.

There was a cycling boom over 1895-97 —see the enthusiastic move into France— as pneumatic tyres attracted  a new class of riders but it was followed by a slump over 1898-99. 
Humber Limited
Following these financial difficulties in 1899 Humber & Co Limited's business was transferred to a new incorporation named Humber Limited.
Raleigh
By 1914 Humber had become Britain's second largest motorcar manufacturer and cycles became less important. In February 1932 renewed financial difficulties in part due to the Great Depression and a brief surge in cycle sales saw Humber's cycle trademarks and patents sold to Raleigh. Humber continued as a premium brand made by Raleigh into the 1960s.

Frame
Humber also manufactured, at one time, an unusual type of bicycle frame known variously as "cross frames", "girder frames", or "truss frames". Their variant was also duplex, consisting in part of smaller side-by-side tubes similar to the duplex fork pictured on this page.

Motorcycles

In 1896 Humber produced the first practical motorcycle by fitting a bicycle with an E. J. Pennington two-horsepower motor.

Gallery

See also
 Humber Motorcycles
 Humber Limited
 Thomas Humber
 List of bicycle manufacturing companies
 Raleigh Cycles - Biggest UK manufacture at one period.

Note

References

Defunct cycle manufacturers of the United Kingdom
Companies based in Nottinghamshire